ADEA may stand for:
 Age Discrimination in Employment Act of 1967, a law in the US
 Association for the Development of Education in Africa
 American Dental Education Association, a non-profit association representing academic dentistry based in Washington, D.C
 Automotive Dealership Excellence Awards, award that recognises excellence in automotive retail in India